Andrey Rasolko (born 13 September 1968) is a Belarusian ice hockey player. He competed in the men's tournament at the 2002 Winter Olympics.

Career statistics

Regular season and playoffs

International

References

1968 births
Living people
Soviet ice hockey centres
Olympic ice hockey players of Belarus
Ice hockey players at the 2002 Winter Olympics
Ice hockey people from Minsk
HC Dinamo Minsk players
Podhale Nowy Targ players
Aalborg Pirates players
Belarusian expatriate sportspeople in Poland
Belarusian expatriate sportspeople in Denmark
Belarusian expatriate sportspeople in Russia
Belarusian ice hockey centres
Belarusian expatriate ice hockey people
Expatriate ice hockey players in Poland
Expatriate ice hockey players in Denmark
Expatriate ice hockey players in Russia